= Elementary School of Bártfa Utca =

Coordinates: 46°05′15″N 18°14′55″E

- Bártfa Utcai Általános Iskola
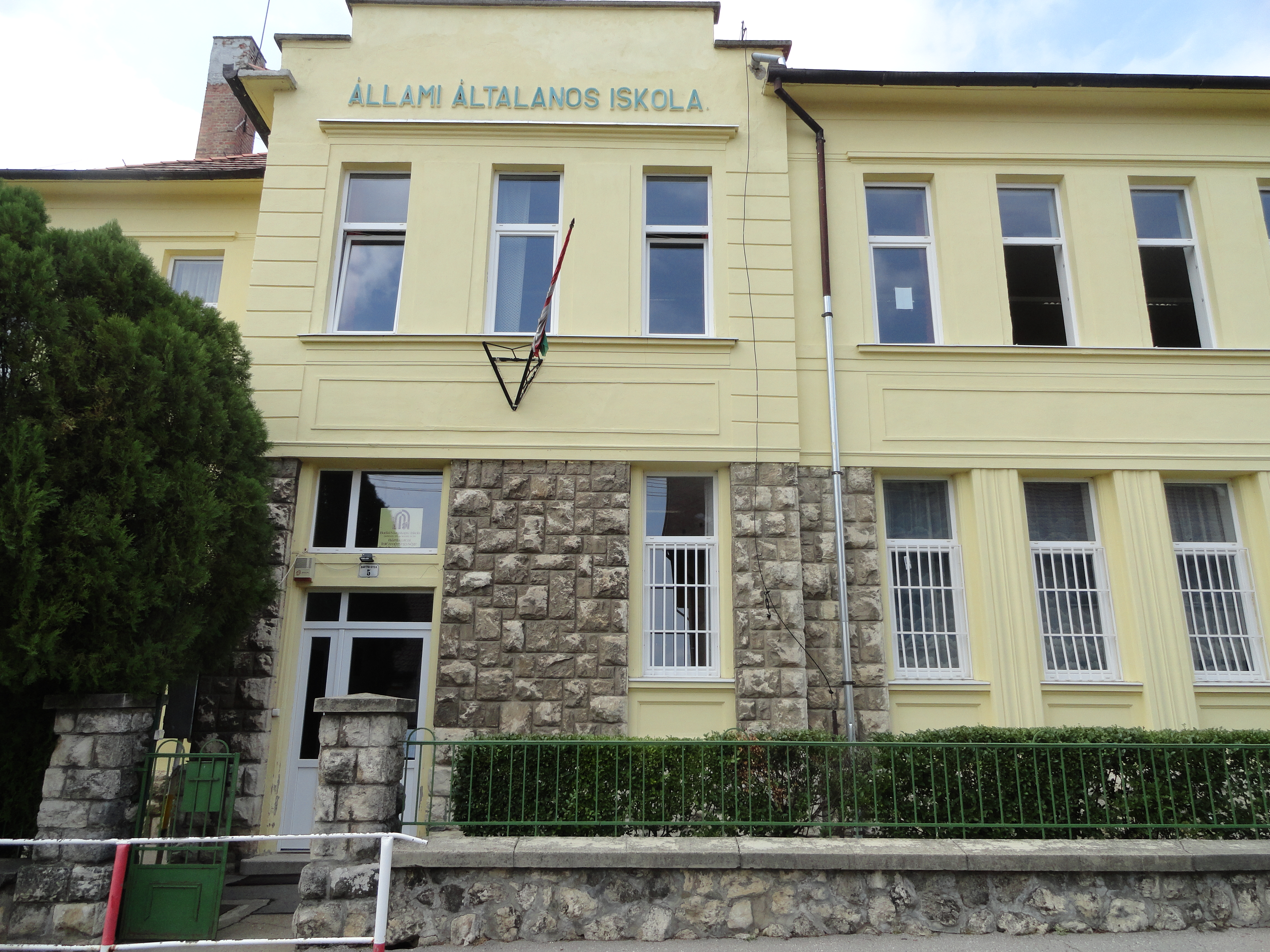

Location
- Bártfa utca 5. Pécs, 7627; Hungary

Information
- School type: elementary school
- Established: 1926
- Website: http://www.bartfa.sulinet.hu/

The Elementary School of Bártfa Utca is a Hungarian elementary school situated in the city of Pécs. It was opened in 1926 as a result of Róbert Szieberth’s idea.

At the beginning of its lifetime, it was known as the "People’s Elementary School of Ullmann-telep" (Hungarian: Ullmann-telepi Állami Elemi Népiskola) and it was housed at the building of current nursery school. Here were two classrooms in the first three years. It had 56, 120 and 181 students in 2, 4 and 6 classes respectively. Szieberth was the one, who proposed the building of the current building of the school. Since 1930 the school is also gets the name of the street where it is located.
